Cove Reber (born August 28, 1985) is an American singer-songwriter and the lead vocalist for American post-hardcore band Dead American and best known as the former lead vocalist of the post-hardcore band Saosin from 2004 to 2010.

Early life 
Cove Reber was born in Provo, Utah, and grew up a member of the Church of Jesus Christ of Latter-day Saints.

During an interview with Shane Told of Silverstein on the Lead Singer Syndrome podcast, Reber cites that he was influenced by the newly "popping off" San Diego pop-punk band Blink-182 specifically taking after the band's vocalist and bassist Mark Hoppus.

Reber started out in early life as vocalist for Vista, California, high school bands Mormon In The Middle and Stamp Out Detroit in the early 2000s before auditioning and joining Saosin as lead vocalist in 2004.

Musical career

Saosin (2004–2010)

In early 2004 Reber auditioned for and integrated in to the post-hardcore band, Saosin, where he replaced vocalist, Anthony Green. With Saosin, Reber recorded The Grey EP, Saosin EP and notably Saosin (2006) and In Search of Solid Ground (2009) with the inclusion of the live album and DVD Come Close at The Theatre of Living Arts in Philadelphia, Pennsylvania on  November 3, 2007.

Reber was asked to leave Saosin in early 2010. Later reports from the band cited that Reber was asked to leave Saosin due to the deterioration of his stage and vocal performance and he could no longer perform. Reber later addressed his departure by saying the following:

Patriot (2011–2016)

After leaving Saosin in 2010, Reber started a project titled Patriot with Joey Bradford (a guitarist of A Static Lullaby and the Used) and Kyle Rosa. In 2011 demo versions of songs Float Away With Me and I Found My Way were released on the groups BandCamp page.
In 2016, Patriot released an official 4-track Dream Weaver EP.

Dead American (2016–present)
Then residing in Salt Lake City in 2016, Reber had met Sleep For Sleepers guitarist Chad Jordan through a friend. Being inspired by instrumental demos that Jordan had recorded, Reber recorded vocals over them. The recorded demos later surfaced in 2017 and into early 2018 on Rebers Instagram feed which included promotional shots and compilations of recording progress teasers under the name Dead American.

Throughout 2018,  Dead American officially released short teasers featuring Reber on their Instagram feed promoting songs from their EP, The Shape of Punk Is Dumb. On September 1, 2018, Ants and Pawns was the first of five successive singles to be released from their EP.  The Shape of Punk is Dumb was released independently on October 5, 2018. On August 23, 2019, the sixth single Wandering was released shortly after the EPs release as a bonus track.

Since 2019, the band went on to sign a record deal with Equal Vision Records and Velocity Records and release two singles Choke and Full of Smoke from their debut album New Nostalgia.

Collaborations

 In 2006, Reber provided guest vocals on the Destroy The Runner debut album Saints and features in the song From The Red.
 In 2008, Reber provided guest vocals on the Norma Jean album The Anti Mother he features on tracks, Surrender Your Sons, Robots: 3, Humans: 0, Murphy Was an Optimist and And There Will Be a Swarm of Hornets.
 In 2016, Reber provided vocals on the HOllOWS track You're Not the Only One from their self-titled EP.
 Scary Kids Scaring Kids enlisted Reber to feature as vocalist for The City Sleeps in Flames 15 year anniversary tour in 2020 and 2021 respectively.
 In February 2022, Reber featured on a track released by Scary Kids Scaring Kids titled Knock It All Down alongside Lil Lotus.

Bands

Discography

Saosin 
EPs

 The Grey EP (2008), Capitol
 Saosin (EP) (2005), Capitol

Albums
 Saosin (2006), Capitol 
 Come Close (2008), Capitol 
 In Search of Solid Ground (2009), Virgin 
Singles

Mookie's Last Christmas (Acoustic Audition, 2004), Independent
 Capitol Demos (Demo, 2005), Independent
 Come Close (Demo, 2005), Independent
 2010 Demos (Demo, 2010), Independent

Patriot 
EPs
 Dream Weaver (EP) (2016), Independent
Singles

 I Found My Way (Demo song, 2011)

Dead American 
EPs
 The Shape of Punk is Dumb (2018), Independent
Albums

 New Nostalgia (2022), Equal Vision Records, Velocity Records

Singles
 False Intentions (2019), Independent
 Wandering (2019), Independent
 Choke (2021), Equal Vision Records, Velocity Records
 Full of Smoke (2022), Equal Vision Records, Velocity Records

References

External links
Saosin's Official Website
Interview with Cove Reber on becoming the new singer of Saosin
Dead American Official Website

1985 births
Living people
American rock singers
Musicians from San Diego
American Latter Day Saints
People from Vista, California
Singers from California
21st-century American singers
21st-century American male singers
Saosin members